Rita Lecumberri (1836-1910) was an Ecuadorian writer and educator. She was a published and awarded poet and essayist. She is also noted for her contribution to the education of women in Ecuador. She was director of the Escuela San Alejo in 1880-82 and 1882-95. A school (El colegio Rita Lecumberri) is named after her, as well as an award. She was born in Guayaquil, and is also buried there.

References

  Avilés Pino, Efrén: Enciclopedia del Ecuador - LECUMBERRI, Rita

1836 births
1910 deaths
Ecuadorian writers
Ecuadorian women writers
People from Guayaquil
19th-century Ecuadorian educators
19th-century Ecuadorian women